Sweat is an Australian drama television series created by John Rapsey and produced by Barron Entertainment in association with the Australian Broadcasting Corporation in Perth. The show aired on Network Ten in 1996 for one season of 26 episodes and centred on students at an Australian school for the athletically gifted. In early 1997, Ten announced that they had no plans for a second season.

Scenes were shot in and around Perth including locations such as HBF Stadium, Arena Joondalup, the Town of Cambridge, the now defunct Perry Lakes Stadium and the Perth SpeedDome.

Cast

Main cast 
 Martin Henderson as Tom Nash
 Inge Hornstra as Tatyana "Tats" Alecsandri
 Melissa Thomas as Sandy Fricker
 Tai Nguyen as Nhon "Noodle" Huong Tran
 Tahnie Merrey as Evie Hogan
 Heath Bergersen as Stewie Perkins
 Heath Ledger as Snowy Bowles
 Matt Castelli as Danny Rodriguez
 Paul Tassone as Don Majors

Additional cast 
 Peter Hardy as Sid O'Reilly
 Frederique Fouche as Jenny Forrest
 Claire Sprunt as Leila Rasheed
 Louise Miller as Sophie Mills
 Quintin George as Greg Rosso
 James Sollis as Chris Wheeler

Recurring cast 
 Gillian Berry as Norma O'Malley (15 episodes)
 Natalie Saleeba as Monique Bellanger (4 episodes)
 Jason Colby as Alex (4 episodes)

Guest cast 
 Zach Justin as Athlete #2 (1 episode) / Matt (2 episodes)
 Simon Baker-Denny as Paul Steadman (1 episode)
 Mouche Phillips as Robyn Barry (1 episode)
 Vivienne Garrett as Mary Rodriguez (1 episode)
 Rod Nunez as Rollo (2 episodes)
 Toby Schmitz as Cameron (2 episodes)
 Michael Loney as Frank Frisker (1 episode)
 Sonia Vinci as Reporter (1 episode)
 Keagan Kang as Richard (1 episode)
 Michael Paget as Scott Davis (2 episodes)
 Mark McAullay as ASDA official (2 episodes)
 Igor Sas as Kev Lindwell (1 episode)
 Marta Kaczmarek as Marta (1 episode)
 Robyn Cruze as Shelley (2 episodes)
 Zoe Ventoura as a dancer (1 episode)

Episodes

International broadcasts 
 Ireland – RTÉ Two (1996–1997)
 England – CITV (1997, 2001)

References

External links 
 

1996 Australian television series debuts
1996 Australian television series endings
1990s teen drama television series
Australian children's television series
Australian drama television series
English-language television shows
Network 10 original programming
Television shows set in Perth, Western Australia